Sweetwater is an unincorporated community located within Mullica Township in Atlantic County, New Jersey, United States.

References

Mullica Township, New Jersey
Unincorporated communities in Atlantic County, New Jersey
Unincorporated communities in New Jersey